Nasim Pedrad (born November 18, 1981) is an American actress, comedian, writer, director, and singer. Pedrad was a cast member on the NBC sketch comedy and variety series Saturday Night Live from 2009 to 2014. She later went on to star in the Fox sitcoms Mulaney (2014–2015) and New Girl (2015–2018), the Fox horror comedy series Scream Queens (2015), and the TBS science fiction comedy series People of Earth (2017). Pedrad also created, produced, and starred in the TBS sitcom Chad (2021).

In film, Pedrad appeared in the romantic comedy No Strings Attached (2011), the animated fantasy The Lorax (2012), the animated comedy Despicable Me 2 (2013), the horror comedy Cooties (2014), the musical fantasy Aladdin (2019), and the comedy Desperados (2020).

Early life
Pedrad was born in Tehran, Iran. Although her father was able to emigrate to the United States, Pedrad and her mother had to stay in Germany, reuniting with her father when she was three years old. Her younger sister, Nina, is a comedy writer.

Nasim graduated from UCLA School of Theater, Film and Television in 2003. She was a member of the UCLA Spring Sing Company.

Career

Early work
Pedrad was a performer with the Sunday Company at The Groundlings. She frequently performed her one-woman show Me, Myself & Iran at the Los Angeles divisions of ImprovOlympic and the Upright Citizens Brigade Theatre. The show was selected for the 2007 HBO Comedy Festival in Las Vegas. She received an LA Weekly Best Comedic Performance of the Year Award as the lead in the comedic spoof After School Special.

Pedrad made her first television appearance on an episode of Gilmore Girls. In 2007, she made a guest appearance on The Winner. She had a recurring role on ER as Nurse Suri. In 2009, she had a guest appearance on It's Always Sunny in Philadelphia.

Saturday Night Live
Pedrad joined the cast of Saturday Night Live in 2009 as part of the 35th (2009–2010) season. Pedrad became a repertory player in the 2011–12 season after two years of being a featured player. Pedrad left SNL in 2014 to work on Mulaney.

Other work
In 2006, she debuted on Gilmore Girls. Nasim was a background actress playing a waitress. Her role was taking the napkin away from the main character, Rory Gilmore. Rory was upset with the waitress for taking the napkin that was placed in-front of her. Her line was “I was just gonna get them out of your way.” And 20 seconds later she said, “Whatever.”
In 2011, she was a recurring voice on the Fox animated series Allen Gregory. She appeared in a small role in the 2011 film No Strings Attached. In 2012, she had a supporting voice role in the animated feature film The Lorax and a small appearance in The Dictator. In 2013, Pedrad had another supporting voice role, in Despicable Me 2. In the autumn of 2014, she left Saturday Night Live to star in a new Fox sitcom, Mulaney. On October 18, 2014, Fox shut down production of the series by reducing the 16-episode order by three episodes. Filming for the thirteenth episode had just been completed prior to the order reduction, and the fourteenth episode was about to enter production.

From 2015 to 2018, Pedrad has a recurring guest role as LAPD officer Aly Nelson on the Fox sitcom New Girl. She portrayed Gigi Caldwell in Season One of the Fox horror-comedy Scream Queens.

In 2016, she appeared in a commercial for Old Navy alongside comedian Kumail Nanjiani and other SNL cast members Cecily Strong and Jay Pharoah.

In 2017, she joined the cast of season 2 of the TBS comedy series People of Earth. Later that same year, she also made guest appearances on Curb Your Enthusiasm and Brooklyn Nine-Nine.

In 2020, she starred as Wesley in the Netflix film Desperados.

In 2021, Pedrad starred in the TBS TV series Chad which she also created, wrote, and directed.

Filmography

Film

Television

References

External links

1981 births
Living people
People from Tehran
People from Irvine, California
American film actresses
American impressionists (entertainers)
American sketch comedians
American television actresses
American voice actresses
American comedians of Iranian descent
American women comedians
Iranian emigrants to the United States
Iranian comedians
UCLA Film School alumni
Comedians from California
21st-century American actresses
21st-century American comedians